Inge Hindkjær (née Henriksen; born 16 November 1958) is a Danish former international footballer who played for Skovlunde IF.

References

External links
 Inge Hindkjær profile at Danish Football Association website

Danish women's footballers
Denmark women's international footballers
1958 births
Living people
Women's association football forwards